Joliette station may refer to:

Joliette station (Montreal Metro), in Montreal, Quebec
Joliette station (Via Rail), in Joliette, Quebec

See also 
 Joliette (disambiguation)